Henri Joel .M Gouhan (born 17 July 1990) is a professional American-Ivorian footballer. He plays with SGFC Eagles Maryland as attacking midfielder in the American Soccer League.

Club career
The midfielder played for Tulsa Roughnecks last season in USL and made his first appearance in a 1-1 draw at Oklahoma City in the Black Gold Derby. He was a starter in Tulsa's final 10 games of the season, recording his first professional goal in a 5-1 win over Real Monarchs SLC last August. Manhebo joined the Roughnecks midway through the club’s inaugural season, and quickly established himself as a key player in the midfield.

Ivory Coast native Henri Manhebo signed a new one-year contract with SGFC Eagles Maryland that will keep him till the next season with an option of extension the team announced his capture early this year during US Soccer Convention.

National team
Henri Manhebo Gouhan has played for the Ivory Coast national under-17 football team. He received a call by Alain Gouaméné Coach to the Ivorian U-17 national football team.

References

External links 
 

1990 births
Living people
Ivorian footballers
Ivorian expatriate footballers
FC Tulsa players
Association football midfielders
Expatriate soccer players in the United States
USL Championship players
Ivorian expatriates in the United States
FC Motown players